Ivan Nikolayevich Shapovalov (Cyrillic: Иван Николаевич Шаповалов, born 28 May 1966) is a musical producer based in Moscow, Russia. He is best known for being the founder and former executive producer/manager for t.A.T.u.

Career 
Before becoming a music producer, Shapovalov worked as a child psychologist, as well as an advertising executive. In 1999, he began to venture into making music videos. That year, Shapovalov, along with Voitinskyi, Sergio Galoyan, Renski and then-lover Elena Kiper, created t.A.T.u., where most of Shapovalov's success would come from. He directed the music video of t.A.T.u's 2002 single "Ya Soshla S Uma" ("All the Things She Said"). Ivan led the girls to stardom as their producer, with a controversial image, and producer of the production company Neformat, which he and Renski formed.

In 2003, Shapovalov formed the project Podnebesnaya to develop his producing skills. He ended up working with many artists, and becoming the producer of 7B and n.A.T.o.

However, in 2004, t.A.T.u. decided to break off from Shapovalov (and Neformat) and continue alone. t.A.T.u. was soon re-signed to Universal Music, appointing Boris Renski as their head producer.

References

External links
 «Тату»-мейкер. Компания № 207.. March 25. 2002 

1966 births
Living people
People from Volgograd Oblast
T.A.T.u.
Russian record producers
Russian music video directors